Jianguomen   is a gate of the historic city wall of Xi'an, China.

History

After the wars and the establishment of the People's Republic of China in 1949, the gate was named Jianguomen.

Jianguomen Bridge, completed in 1985, is right in front of the gate.

References

Buildings and structures in Xi'an